"Blacksmith", also known as "A Blacksmith Courted Me", is a traditional English folk song listed as number 816 in the Roud Folk Song Index.

Traditional versions 
The song was noted down by Ralph Vaughan Williams in 1909 from a Mrs Ellen Powell of Westhope near Weobley, Herefordshire, and his transcription is available online via the Vaughan Williams Memorial Library. On that occasion it was sung to the tune "Monk's Gate", better known as the tune of "To be a pilgrim", the hymn by John Bunyan. The same tune is sometimes used for the song "Our Captain Cried", which can be considered a version of the same song. George Butterworth (a friend of Vaughan Williams and Cecil Sharp) collected another version of the song with a similar tune from a Mrs. Verrall of Horsham, Sussex in 1909, and included a setting of the song in his 1912 collection Folk Songs from Sussex.

Several traditional singers from the South of England have been recorded singing versions of the song, such as the travellers Phoebe Smith (1969) and Caroline Hughes (1963/66), Harry Brazil of Gloucestershire, George "Pop" Maynard of Sussex (1962), Tom Willett of Surrey (1960), Charlie Scamp of Kent (1954). [The recordings of Tom Willet, Phoebe Smith, Caroline Hughes and George "Pop" Maynard can be heard via the Vaughan Williams Memorial Library website]

Popular Recordings
The song has been recorded many times. Steeleye Span lead off their first two studio albums Hark! The Village Wait (1970) and Please to See the King (1971) with different versions of the song; it also can be heard on several of their live albums.  Andy Irvine sings it on Planxty's debut album Planxty (1973), Loreena McKennitt on Elemental (1985), Pentangle on the album So Early in the Spring (1989), and Eddi Reader on Mirmama (1992). Maddy Prior (of Steeleye Span) also sings an a cappella version of the song on her solo album Ballads and Candles (2000).

There are also versions by  Martin Simpson and Kathy & Carol, The Critics Group, Shirley Collins, Barbara Dickson on the album Do Right Woman, Phil Cooper on the album Pretty Susan, Scatter the Mud on the album In the Mood. Linda Ronstadt gives an a cappella rendition on the 1990 compilation album Rubáiyát. Barry Dransfield recorded an unusual instrumental version of the tune. Jah Wobble recorded a version of the song on his 1996 album English Roots Music. Runa recorded a version on their debut album Jealousy.

For a discography with lyric versions, see Reinhard Zierke's site.

Lyrics
(collected by Ralph Vaughan Williams from Ellen Powell, 1909)

References 

English folk songs
Year of song unknown
Songwriter unknown